Tomáš Čajka (Ph.D. in 2009), is a Czech chemist, who is active in the field of analytical chemistry; he is an associate professor of the Department of metabolomics, Institute of physiology CAS (Prague).

Works 
 Novel approaches to streamlining gas chromatographic analysis of food and environmental contaminants, Ph.D. thesis, 2009.

Awards 
 The Young Authors’ Best Paper in Spectroscopy - The Ioannes Marcus Marci Spectroscopic Society (2007).

References

Literature 
 Tomas Cajka // The Analytical Scientist - Texere Publishing Limited, 2018.

Web-sources 
 

Living people
Czech chemists
People associated with the Czech Academy of Sciences
Year of birth missing (living people)